Johngarthia is a genus of crabs in the land crab family Gecarcinidae, formerly included in the genus Gecarcinus, and containing these species:

The genus bears the name of John S. Garth, a 20th century naturalist who specialized in crabs and other arthropods.

Notes

References

Further reading
 Robert Perger "A New Species of Johngarthia from Clipperton and Socorro Islands in the Eastern Pacific Ocean (Crustacea: Decapoda: Gecarcinidae)," Pacific Science 73(2), (12 April 2019).

https://doi.org/10.2984/73.2.9

Grapsoidea
Terrestrial crustaceans